An incomplete list of parts making up STEP (ISO 10303):

Descriptions methods
 Part 1 - Overview and fundamental principles (1994). Unfortunately outdated, not covering the role of AICs and modules.
 Part 11 - EXPRESS language reference manual
 Part 12 - EXPRESS -I language reference manual (withdrawn)
 Part 14 - EXPRESS -X language reference manual

Implementation methods
 Part 15 - SysML XMI to XSD transformation
 Part 21 - STEP-File Clear text encoding of the exchange structure
 Part 22 - SDAI Standard data access interface specification
 Part 23 - C++ language binding of the standard data access interface
 Part 24 - C language binding of the standard data access interface
 Part 25 - EXPRESS to OMG XMI binding
 Part 26 - Binary representation of EXPRESS-driven data using HDF5
 Part 27 - Java TM programming language binding to the standard data access interface with Internet/Intranet extensions
 Part 28 - STEP-XML XML representation for EXPRESS-driven data

Conformance testing methodology and framework
 Part 31 - General concepts
 Part 32 - Requirements on testing laboratories and clients
 Part 34 - Abstract test methods for application protocol implementations
 Part 35 - Abstract test methods for SDAI implementations

Integrated generic resources
 Part 41 - Fundamentals of product description and support
 Part 42 - Geometric and topological representation
 Part 43 - Representation structures
 Part 44 - Product structure configuration
 Part 45 - Materials
 Part 46 - Visual presentation: Works in combination with part42 and allows to specify how to display 2D or 3D geometric models together with annotation data. The original design intend was that data according to this part could be displayed by computer systems supporting the Graphical Kernel System or PHIGS. Today other display interfaces such as OpenGL for 3D and Java 2D are more appropriate to display part 46 based data.
 Part 47 - Shape variation tolerances: This part supports the representation of Geometric dimensioning and tolerancing principles for computer sensitive data exchange. But it does not cover how to present the data for humans.
 Part 49 - Process structures and properties
 Part 50 - Mathematical constructs
 Part 51 - Mathematical description
 Part 52 - Mesh-based topology
 Part 53 - Numerical analysis
 Part 54 - Classification and set theory
 Part 55 - Procedural and hybrid representation
 Part 56 - State
 Part 57 - Expression extensions
 Part 58 - Risk
 Part 59 - Quality of product shape data
 Part 61 - Systems engineering representation

Integrated application resources
 Part 101 - Draughting
 Part 104 - Finite element analysis
 Part 105 - Kinematics
 Part 107 - Finite element analysis definition relationships
 Part 108 - Parameterization and constraints for explicit geometric product models
 Part 109 - STEP assembly model for products
 Part 110 - Computational fluid dynamics data
 Part 111 - Elements for the procedural modelling of solid shapes
 Part 112 - Standard modelling commands for the procedural exchange of 2D CAD models

Application Protocol
The 'APs' utilize the lower-level information of integrated resources in well defined combinations and configurations to represent a particular data model of an engineering or technical application.
 Part 201 - Explicit draughting. Simple 2D drawing geometry related to a product. No association, no assembly hierarchy. Practically a subset of AP202 and 214.
 Part 202 - Associative draughting. 2D/3D drawing with association, but no product structure. Practically a subset of AP214.
 Part 203: Configuration controlled 3D designs of mechanical parts and assemblies. Mainly used for 3D design and product structure. A subset of AP214 but most widely used.
 Part 204 - Mechanical design using boundary representation
 Part 207 - Sheet metal die planning and design
 Part 209 - Composite and metallic structural analysis and related design
 Part 210 - Electronic assembly, interconnect and packaging design. The most complex and sophisticated STEP AP.
 Part 212 - Electrotechnical design and installation. Designed as a complement for AP214, but not fully harmonized with it. 
 Part 214 - Core data for automotive mechanical design processes
 Part 215 - Ship arrangement
 Part 216 - Ship moulded forms
 Part 218 - Ship structures
 Part 219 - Dimensional inspection information exchange
 Part 221 - Functional data and their schematic representation for process plant
 Part 223 - Exchange of design and manufacturing product information for cast parts, currently on CD level
 Part 224 - Mechanical product definition for process plans using machining features
 Part 225 - Building elements using explicit shape representation
 Part 227 - Plant spatial configuration
 Part 232 - Technical data packaging core information and exchange
 Part 233 - Systems engineering
 Part 235 - Materials information for the design and verification of products
 Part 236 - Furniture catalog and interior design
 Part 237 - Fluid dynamics
 Part 238 - STEP-NC Application interpreted model for computerized numerical controllers
 Part 239 - Product life cycle support
 Part 240 - Process plans for machined products
 Part 242 - Managed model-based 3D engineering

ATS - Abstract test suite
An ATS is a formal description on how to test STEP implementations for conformance. They contain a test plan for postprocessors (exporting STEP data) and preprocessors (importing STEP data). The structure of an ATS is defined in part 34.

The original plan of STEP was to have for every AP 2xx a corresponding ATS 3xx, but only a few were finally realized till today.

 Part 304 - Abstract test suite: Mechanical design using boundary representation
 Part 307 - Abstract test suite: Sheet metal die planning and design

AIC - Application interpreted constructs
AICs are specializations of the integrated application and generic resources. This is done by subtyping interfaced entities and adding further constraints and rules. No new stand-alone entities are created and no new explicit attributes are added. Most AICs are specializations in the geometric area. AICs did not exist back in 1994 when the first release of STEP got published. But when the 2nd generation of APs grows up it becomes clear that APs do not only share not only the IRs but also a lot of specializations. AICs are a big step towards AP interoperability.
 Part 501 - Edge-based wireframe
 Part 502 - Shell-based wireframe
 Part 503 - Geometrically bounded 2D wireframe
 Part 504 - Draughting annotation
 Part 505 - Drawing structure and administration
 Part 506 - Draughting elements
 Part 507 - Geometrically bounded surface
 Part 508 - Non-manifold surface
 Part 509 - Manifold surface
 Part 510 - Geometrically bounded wireframe
 Part 511 - Topologically bounded surface
 Part 512 - Faceted boundary representation
 Part 513 - Elementary boundary representation
 Part 514 - Advanced boundary representation
 Part 515 - Constructive solid geometry
 Part 517 - Mechanical design geometric presentation
 Part 518 - Mechanical design shaded representation
 Part 519 - Geometric tolerances
 Part 520 - Associative draughting elements
 Part 521 - Manifold subsurface
 Part 522 - Machining features
 Part 523 - Curve swept solid

AM - Application modules
see ISO 10303 Application Modules

References

Computer-aided design software
CAD file formats
Computer file formats
 
Lists of parts